Katie Schofield (born 25 March 1984) is a New Zealand professional racing cyclist. She rode at the 2015 UCI Track Cycling World Championships.

Major results
2014
Oceania Track Championships
1st  500m Time Trial
2nd Team Sprint (with Stephanie McKenzie)
3rd Sprint, BikeNZ Classic
3rd Sprint, BikeNZ Cup
2015
Oceania Track Championships
2nd Team Sprint (with Natasha Hansen)
3rd 500m Time Trial
3rd Scratch Race, Champions of Sprint

References

External links

1984 births
Living people
New Zealand female cyclists
Place of birth missing (living people)
21st-century New Zealand women